Ringwood Aerodrome was an aerodrome constructed in 1942 by the Royal Australian Air Force as a satellite aerodrome near Eagleton, New South Wales, Australia during World War II.

The aerodrome was used as a satellite field for RAAF Base Williamtown near Newcastle.

References

Former Royal Australian Air Force bases
Military establishments in the Hunter Region
History of Newcastle, New South Wales
Former military installations in New South Wales